Ann or Anne Clarke may refer to:

 Ann Clarke (immunologist), co-founder in 2004 of the Frozen Ark project
 Anne Clarke (theatre producer) (born 1961), Irish theatre producer
 Anne Clarke (theatre manager) (1806–?), Australian stage actor, singer and theatre manager
 Nancy Clarke (entrepreneur) (died 1811/12), Barbadian hotelier and free woman of colour
 Anne Clarke (archaeologist), Australian archaeologist
 Ann M. Clarke (1928–2015), developmental psychologist
Anne Clarke, American-born British politician from London

See also
 Anne Clark (disambiguation)